The 2014 North Carolina A&T Aggies football team represented North Carolina A&T State University as a member of Mid-Eastern Athletic Conference (MEAC) during the 2014 NCAA Division I FCS football season. Led by fourth-year head coach Rod Broadway, the Aggies compiled an overall record of 9–3 with a mark of 6–2 in conference play, placing in a five-way tie for the MEAC title with Bethune–Cookman, Morgan State, North Carolina Central, and South Carolina State. Morgan State received the conference's automatic bid to the NCAA Division I Football Championship. None of the other co-champions earned an at-large bid. North Carolina A&T played home games at Aggie Stadium in Greensboro, North Carolina.

Previous season
The Aggies finished the 2013 season with a 7–4 record, 4–4 in MEAC play to finish in a three-way tie with Hampton & Howard for 5th place.

Before the season
During the annual MEAC Media Day, North Carolina A&T were selected to finish 3rd in the conference. The conference also released the 2014 All-MEAC Preseason team, which included 10 North Carolina A&T Aggies. Of the 10 players named, sophomore Running Back Tarik Cohen, senior Wide Receiver Desmond Lawrence, fifth-year Offensive Lineman Willie Robinson, and fifth-year Linebacker D'Vonte Grant were named to the conference's first team.

Recruiting

Schedule

Roster

Coaching staff

Game summaries

Alabama A&M

With the game's regular venue, Downtown Orlando's Florida Citrus Bowl in the midst of renovations, the 10th annual MEAC/SWAC Challenge was played at Bright House Networks Stadium on the campus of UCF. This was the first meeting between the two teams, and A&T's first time playing in the MEAC/SWAC Challenge. The game also marked the fifth time that A&T head coach Rod Broadway would face Alabama A&M during his coaching career. Broadway has an undefeated record against the Bulldogs, winning all four previous meetings.

Speed became Alabama A&M's undoing in this meeting, as the Aggies sprinted to touchdown runs of 26, 59 and 80 and had a 95-yard kickoff return by junior Tony McRae, all in the first half. Sophomore Tarik Cohen was named the game's MVP after rushing for 161 yards and two touchdowns on 10 carries. Junior quarterback Kwashaun Quick, making his third straight start on opening day, rushed for 94 yards including two touchdowns and threw for 94 yards on 9-for-16 passing. The Bulldogs of Alabama A&M kept NC A&T on the sideline early thanks to a 12-play drive. AAMU's Jaymason Lee's completed pass Tevin McKenzie advanced the ball to the A&T 3-yard line, but it was short of the first down. The Bulldogs settled for a Ceaser Diaz-Ramon 20-yard field goal and a 3-0 lead. Diaz-Ramon's botched onside kick that followed allowed the Aggies to take over at the A&M 37 yard line. After an 11-yard run on a reverse by Desmond Lawrence, Quick was able to make a 26-yard run for a touchdown. The Aggies never trailed again despite Alabama A&M's efforts on its next drive. The Bulldogs again advanced the ball inside the A&T red zone only to settle for another Diaz-Ramon field goal that made it 7-6 with 16 seconds remaining in the first quarter. Once again A&T's speed responded. McRae took the Diaz-Ramon's kickoff for a 95-yard return for a touchdown. The Aggies led at the end of the first quarter 14-6. A&T directed that energy toward the scoreboard while Quick seemed to drain any energy the Bulldogs had left with a 59-yard touchdown run off of a fake to Cohen that left Bulldog defenders frozen. Cohen said that fake aided in his 80-yard touchdown run that gave the Aggies a commanding 28-6 lead. The Aggies’ 34-point win was their most lopsided win over a SWAC opponent in school history, surpassing the Aggies 28-12 win over Grambling in 1991. Fifth-year linebacker D’Vonte Grant and redshirt junior Denzel Jones led the Aggies defensively with 10 tackles apiece.

Coastal Carolina

This was the fifth meeting between the Aggies and 5th-ranked Chanticleers, with Coastal Carolina now holding 5–0 record over A&T. Coastal Carolina won the last meeting in 2012, 29–13. The Aggies were the first to score as a 36-yard punt return by freshman Khris Gardin set up a 2-yard touchdown run by quarterback Kwashaun Quick to give the Aggies a 7-0 first-quarter lead. A&T forced three first-quarter turnovers but were not able to turn any of them into points. In the second quarter, Coastal Carolina responded by scoring 17 quick unanswered points on three drives that took only a combined 4:48 off the clock. The Aggies answered as Tarik Cohen broke through the line of scrimmage and made a slide move into the end zone for a 22-yard touchdown run. His run was set up by a 40-yard completion from wide receiver Denzel Keyes to tight end Dequan Swann after Keyes caught a lateral from Quick as the Aggies went into halftime down 17–14.

The Aggies took their first lead of the game in the fourth quarter as Kwashaun Quick avoided a host of Chanticleer tacklers on his way to scoring on a 29-yard touchdown run, which put the Aggies up 30-24 with 7:16 remaining in the game. During the scoring play, Quick's helmet came off, and by rule, he was required to sit out the next play. In the following play, replacement holder and punter Dominic Frescura mishandled a low snap and was eventually wrapped up and sent to the ground by Coastal's Taylor Bagley. Coastal's Devin Brown added pain to A&T's special teams when he returned the ensuing kickoff 99 yards resulting in a touchdown. Alex Catron added the crucial extra point on to the end of Brown's run to give the Chanticleers a 31-30 lead. The Aggies still had a chance to win, when quarterback Kwashaun Quick threw a 19-yard pass to Xavier Griffin, which gave the Aggies a first-and-10 on the Coastal 38-yard line with five minutes to play. But on a 3rd-and-9 from the Coastal 37, Quick was sacked for a 3-yard loss. The Aggies decided to punt on fourth down with less than four minutes remaining, and the Chanticleers ran out the clock for the win.

Elon

This was the 10th meeting between A&T and nearby In-state FCS opponent Elon. The Aggies hold a 6-4 all-time record against the Phoenix, with a 23-10 in front of a Home crowd in 2013.

The Aggie defense maintained, as the Phoenix were unable to score a touchdown the entire game, despite the advancing to the Aggies 3, 5, 11, 4, 6-yard lines on five separate occasions. Elon kicker John Gallagher provided all the scoring for the Phoenix by scoring on 4 of 5 of the Phoenix’ s trips inside the Aggies 10. Running Back Tarik Cohen rushed for a career-high 234 yards and ran for a game-winning 81-yard touchdown in the fourth quarter. It was the second 200-yard rushing performance of Cohen's career, and his fourth straight 100-plus rushing game dating back to last season.

Chowan

This was the first meeting between the Aggies and Hawks

Howard

South Carolina State

Hampton

Delaware State

Florida A&M

The Aggies fell behind early by a touchdown, as Florida A&M went 75 yards on 11 plays capped by a Damien Fleming touchdown pass to Lemond Buice. A&T's used of a 3-yard lob by Quarterback Kwashaun Quick, and a 1-yard plunge by Marquell Cartwright would take the Aggies to a 20-14 lead at the half.

Morgan State

Savannah State

This was the second meeting between the Aggies and the Tigers. The Aggies won the previous meeting 41-14 in front of a home crowd inside Aggie Stadium. For A&T's defense, the victory secured the team's second straight shutout of the season,  and the first time since 1954 the Aggies have put together two consecutive shutouts. With the win, the Aggies clinched the MEAC championship for the first time since 2003, and guaranteed at least a share of the conference title.

North Carolina Central

This game marked the 86th meeting between the North Carolina Central and the NC A&T Aggies and is part of the multi-sport rivalry between the two. Commonly referred to as the "Aggie–Eagle classic," this particular rivalry is the longest-running for both schools and dates back to the 1920s. A&T came into the 2014 contest nationally ranked for the first time since 2003; and on a three-year winning streak over the North Carolina Central, including a 28–0 victory the previous year. The contest also had conference championship implications for both teams as the Aggies, who clinched the MEAC championship after defeating the Savannah State Tigers the week prior, needed the victory to secure the MEAC Championship outright and the Eagles needed a victory to secure a share of the title. Attendance for this game was 13,326, which is 2,726 more than the official stadium capacity for O'Kelly–Riddick Stadium.

Ranking movements

Postseason
As the 2014 college football season neared the end, many organizations began to announce finalists and winners of various past-season awards. Aggie players and coaches appeared on many of these lists. As a team, the Aggies lead the nation in takeaways this season. Additionally, A&T were second in the nation for interceptions, third in scoring defense, third in team passing efficiency defense, fifth in turnover margin and seventh in red zone defense.

Head coach Rod Broadway was one of 20 finalists who have been nominated for the 2014 Eddie Robinson Award, which is awarded to the top head coach in the NCAA Division I Football Championship Subdivision by a panel of sports information directors, broadcasters, writers and other dignitaries. This marked the second time in Broadway's career that he had been nominated for the award.

Several players for the Aggies were also honored. A&T sophomore running back Tarik Cohen was named MEAC co-offensive player of the year. Cohen led the MEAC in rushing and recorded his second straight 1,000 yard season with 1,340 total yards. In addition, Cohen was ranked 15th in the nation in rushing. He also led the conference with 121.8 rushing yards per game, 197 carries, with 15 touchdowns in 11 games.  In addition, Cohen led the conference in scoring, with 96 points; touchdowns, with 16, and finished second in all-purpose yardage with 143.4 average yards per game. This season, Cohen also earned the Sports Networks’ Player of the Week honor once and received the MEAC offensive player of the week honor twice. In addition to Cohen, Redshirt Senior Left Guard William Ray Robinson III, Senior Linebacker D'Vonte Grant, and  Redshirt Senior Cornerback Donald Mattocks earned BOXTOROW Black College All-American honors. Grant, Mattocks, Cohen, and Junior Defensive Back Tony McRae also earned Beyond Sports Network FCS All-American recognition, while Redshirt Senior Offensive Lineman Ronald Canty earned FCS All-American honors from the American Football Coaches Association.

The following A&T players were also named to the All–MEAC First, Second, and Third Teams:

2015 NFL draft

The 2015 NFL Draft was held on April 30– May 2, 2015 at the Auditorium Theatre and in Grant Park in Chicago Illinois. The following A&T players were either selected or signed as undrafted free agents following the draft.

References

North Carolina AandT
North Carolina A&T Aggies football seasons
Mid-Eastern Athletic Conference football champion seasons